Provancher may refer to:

Léon Abel Provancher (1820–1892), a Canadian Catholic parish priest and naturalist
Léon-Provancher Ecological Reserve, a protected area in Bécancour, Quebec, Canada
Provancher Creek, a tributary of the Mégiscane River in La Tuque, Mauricie, Quebec, Canada

See also
Provencher
Provenchère (disambiguation)